Juninho realname Fidelis Júnior Santana da Silva (born 14 May 1981 in Rio de Janeiro) is a Brazilian footballer who played as an attacking midfielder.

He also played for Friburguense and Swiss club FC Winterthur.

He signed a contract until the end of 2007 on 3 August 2007 for Floresta.

He was released in December 2007. After not played in state league, he signed a contract with Salgueiro of Brasileiro Série C until end of season.

References

1981 births
Living people
Brazilian footballers
Friburguense Atlético Clube players
Association football midfielders
Footballers from Rio de Janeiro (city)